Uttar Dinajpur, also known as North Dinajpur, is a district of the Indian state of West Bengal. Created on 1 April 1992 by the division of the erstwhile West Dinajpur district, it comprises two subdivisions: Raiganj and Islampur.

History 
Undivided Dinajpur district was part of the Pundra kingdom. The whole of Pundra was part of the Mauryan empire, and Jainism was spread in the region in the fourth century BCE. Their capital was at Pundrabardhan (now in Bangladesh), and two other ancient towns were Gourpur and Kotibarsha, now called Bangarh. Later multiple inscriptions show how the Guptas also controlled Pundra. The district was then under Pala rule from 750 CE. The Senas overthrew the Palas in 1143. In 1204, Bakhtiyar Khilji defeated the Senas and had Bangarh as its capital. After his murder, it was controlled by various governors sent by the Delhi Sultan from Gauda. In 1586, Mughal Emperor Akbar conquered Bengal and Dinajpur was controlled by the sarkars of Tajpur and Panjara. In 1765, it fell under the rule of the East India Company and was ruled from Murshidabad. In the later part of the 18th century, the district was home to the Sanyasi-Fakir rebellion until the early 19th century. The district remained relatively peaceful all through the rest of the 1800s. In 1905, the people of Dinajpur district protested against the Partition of Bengal. They participated in the Freedom struggle by refusing to pay tax, doing hartals, and launching agitations. In 1947, Dinajpur district was split between India and Pakistan with West Dinajpur remaining with India. In 1992, West Dinajpur district was bifurcated to form Uttar Dinajpur and Dakshin Dinajpur districts.

Geography
Uttar Dinajpur district lies between latitude 25°11' N to 26°49' N and longitude 87°49' E to 90°00' E occupying an area of  enclosed by Panchagarh, Thakurgaon and Dinajpur districts of Bangladesh on the east, Kishanganj, Purnia and Katihar districts of Bihar on the west, Darjeeling district and Jalpaiguri district on the north and Malda district and Dakshin Dinajpur district on the south. Uttar Dinajpur is well connected with the rest of the state through National Highways, State Highways and Railways. NH-27 and NH-12 pass through the heart of the district.

The regional topography is generally flat with a gentle southerly slope towards which the main rivers like Kulik, Nagar, Mahananda. The District forms a part of the basin lying between Rajmahal hills on the east. The older alluvium is estimated to be Pleistocene age. Uttar Dinajpur is bestowed with a very fertile soil. The soil is very rich in nature due to the alluvial deposition which helps to grow Paddy, Jute, Mesta and Sugarcane etc. Raiganj on the banks of the River Kulik is the District Headquarters where the Raiganj Wildlife Sanctuary, the second largest bird sanctuary in Asia, is situated. There are four municipalities, nine blocks and 99 Panchayats covering 1577 villages.

Economy
In 2006 the Ministry of Panchayati Raj named Uttar Dinajpur one of the country's 250 most backward districts (out of a total of 640). It is one of the eleven districts in West Bengal currently receiving funds from the Backward Regions Grant Fund Programme (BRGF).
but now Dalkhola the main commercial, business town with well connected railway and roadways. increasing the economy of Dalkhola and Uttar Dinajpur District.

Divisions

Sub-divisions
Uttar Dinajpur District comprises two subdivisions:
Raiganj Sub-Division and
Islampur Sub-Division

Assembly constituencies
As per order of the Delimitation Commission in respect of the delimitation of constituencies in the West Bengal, the district is divided into nine assembly constituencies:

Hemtabad and Kaliaganj constituencies are reserved for Scheduled Castes (SC) candidates. Along with six assembly constituencies from Darjeeling district, Chopra constituency forms the Darjeeling (Lok Sabha constituency). Islampur, Goalpokhar, Chakulia, Karandighi, Hemtabad, Kaliaganj and Raiganj constituencies forms the Raiganj (Lok Sabha constituency). Along with six assembly constituencies from South Dinajpur district, Itahar forms the Balurghat (Lok Sabha constituency).

Demographics

According to the 2011 census Uttar Dinajpur district has a population of 3,007,134, roughly equal to the nation of Albania or the US state of Mississippi. This gives it a ranking of 124th in India (out of a total of 640). Its population growth rate over the decade 2001-2011 was  22.9%. Uttar Dinajpur has a sex ratio of 936 females for every 1000 males, and a literacy rate of 59.1%. Scheduled Castes and Scheduled Tribes make up 26.87% and 5.41% of the population respectively. 2,644,906 were rural and 362,228 were urban.

Religion

Language

According to the 2011 census, 68.06% of the population spoke Bengali, 13.22% Surjapuri, 9.48% Urdu, 3.77% Santali, 3.76% Hindi and 1.03% Rajbongshi as their first language.

Bengali is the main language but a sizeable number of Urdu, Hindi and Maithili speaking people live in Islampur sub-division. It is one of the most backward districts of India educationally and economically owing to state neglect. The Bengali dialects here are spoken in the district, are variously called as Varendri and Dinajpuri.

Education
As of 2012, there were 3282 schools in the Uttar Dinajpur district. 3100 of these are in rural areas, and 182 urban.

There is Raiganj University in Uttar Dinajpur situated at Raiganj

Others general degree and diploma colleges are here also.

Some notable colleges such as:
 Chopra Kamala Paul Smriti Mahavidyalaya
 Dr. Meghnad Saha College
 Islampur College
 Islampur Government Polytechnic
 Kaliyaganj College
 Raiganj Government Medical College and Hospital
 Raiganj Polytechnic
 Raiganj Surendranath Mahavidyalaya
 Shree Agrasen Mahavidyalaya

Flora and fauna

Transport 
Major railway stations are Raiganj(RGJ), Radhikapur (RDP), Kaliyagunj, Dalkolha and Aluabari Road Jn (Islampur). Dalkolha is most important stoppage of long-distance train. NH 27 and NH 12 are two National Highways in this District. Radhikapur-Kolkata (RDP-KOAA) Express train and Radhikapur-Howrah Kulik Express (RDP-HWH) are the two direct train for Raiganj to South Bengal Communication. Although RDP-SGUJ DEMU is the only direct train for Raiganj to North Bengal Communication. NBSTC, SBSTC are transport corporations serving the area. Siliguri More is that point zone which connect four district zone North Dinajpur,  South Dinajpur, North Bengal and South Bengal through High Ways.

Tourism 
 Raiganj Wildlife Sanctuary, the largest bird sanctuary of Asia
 Swaminath Temple at Swaminath
 Rajbari at Rajbari Gate
 Shiv Mandir at Itahar
 Danhasori Pithasthal at Chandigram
 Shree Shree Ma Bhabani Devi Than at Bouaha
Shidhi binayak Mandir at, Maharaja Hat

Villages 
 

Baroduary

See also 
 Bengali language Movement (North Dinajpur)

Notes

References

External links 

 Official Website
Uttar-Dinajpur.com

 
Districts of West Bengal
Minority Concentrated Districts in India
1992 establishments in West Bengal